The 2015 Giro d'Italia was the first of cycling's Grand Tours to take place in the 2015 road cycling season. It was the 98th edition of the Giro d'Italia. The race started on 9 May in San Lorenzo al Mare and ended on 31 May in Milan. Although it took place principally in Italy, the route also led the riders into Switzerland.

The 17 UCI WorldTeams were automatically invited and obliged to attend the race. In October 2014, five UCI Professional Continental teams were awarded wildcard places in the race by RCS Sport, the organisers of the Giro, to complete the 22-team peloton. As there were nine men in each team, the initial startlist consisted of 198 riders. However, as 's George Bennett was forced to withdraw before the race start due to a blood test that revealed a low level of cortisol, only 197 riders started the first stage. These came from 36 countries; more than a quarter of the peloton (59 riders) were Italian, while no other nation had more than 15 riders participating in the race.

The final stage in Milan was completed by 163 riders, with 34 failing to finish the race. The race was won by Alberto Contador (riding for the  team). Contador wore the general classification leader's pink jersey for the first time on stage 5, the race's first summit finish. He maintained the lead for several days, despite injuring his shoulder in a crash on stage 6. Contador lost the lead to Fabio Aru on stage 13 after being held up in another crash, but regained it the following day, when he beat his rivals by several minutes in the race's only individual time trial. Despite coming under pressure from Aru and his teammate Mikel Landa in the final week of racing, Contador preserved his lead to the end of the Giro. Aru finished second, nearly two minutes behind Contador, and won the young rider classification; Landa completed the podium, more than a minute behind Aru. The points classification was won by Giacomo Nizzolo, while the mountains classification was won by Giovanni Visconti. Astana won both team classifications.

Teams
All 17 UCI WorldTeams were automatically invited and were obliged to attend the race. In January 2015, their entry was officially confirmed with the announcement of the five wildcard places, which completed the 22-team peloton.

The 22 teams that competed in the race were:

 UCI WorldTeams

  (riders)
  (riders)
  (riders)
  (riders)
  (riders)
  (riders)
  (riders)
  (riders)
  (riders)
  (riders)
  (riders)
  (riders)
  (riders)
  (riders)
  (riders)
  (riders)
  (riders)

UCI Professional Continental teams

  (riders)
  (riders)
  (riders)
  (riders)
  (riders)

Cyclists

By starting number

By team

By nationality
The 198 riders that competed in the 2015 Giro d'Italia originated from 36 different countries. Riders from eight countries won stages during the race; Italian riders won the highest number, with seven riders winning a total of nine stages.

References

External links

2015 Giro d'Italia
2015